The Ten may refer to:
The Ten (film), the 2007 American film
The Ten American Painters, an American Impressionist artists' group active during the late 19th and early 20th centuries, not to be confused with a later group (below) by the same name
The Ten (Expressionists), an American artists' group active during the 1930s, not to be confused with an earlier group (above) by the same name
The Ten (novel), a Greek novel and TV series
The Ten (TV series), a Greek TV series
Interstate 10 in California, commonly referred to as "the 10" by people from Southern California

See also
Ten (disambiguation)